The "May Manifesto" of May 6, 1924 was a paper in which the objectives of the unified Macedonian liberation movement were presented: independence and unification of partitioned region of Macedonia, fighting all the neighbouring Balkan monarchies, supporting the Balkan Communist Federation and cooperation with the Soviet Union.

Macedonian question and Balkan Communist Federation

In 1919, the Balkan Communist Federation was established as an umbrella group for the various Balkan communist parties and had the official endorsement of the Soviets. Its first meeting was called in Sofia to promote Bulgarian communists Macedonian Question policy. It was heavily influenced by the policy of the Bulgarian Communist Party (BCP), which had the strongest following of either the Greek or Yugoslavian parties. The BCP agenda was endorsed by the Soviets, who felt it best served their goals of spreading communism in the Balkans. They felt the Bulgarians were the most revolutionary in desiring an overthrow of the First World War peace settlements enforced by the national bourgeois establishment of the Balkan states. They could also play the 'Macedonian card' as a source for revolution. Macedonia was used by the Balkan communists as a rallying point to overthrow the existing social and political order. For the communists, Macedonia was to be a political entity of various nationalities. The BCP took full advantage of this bias.

Internal Macedonian Revolutionary Organization's factions

To further its goals, the BCP enlisted the support of the leftist in former Internal Macedonian-Adrianople Revolutionary Organization (IMARO), who espoused pro-Balkan Federation views. They changed their name to Macedonian Federative Organization (known as the "Federalists") and in 1918 outlined their policy in a manifesto. Its main points being the restoration of Macedonia to its original geographical boundaries. Their policy led them into open confrontation with the right-wing faction of the Internal Macedonian Revolutionary Organization (IMRO). At the Balkan Communist Conference in Vienna in May 1922, the Bulgarian delegate Vasil Kolarov first raised the issue of Macedonian and Thracian autonomy. Knowing the proposal was a threat to their countries borders, the Greek and Yugoslav delegates were unable to endorse it at this stage; however, in order for any chance of success, the communists needed the support of the IMRO. In June 1923, the IMRO collaborated with a nationalist military clique and overthrew the Bulgarian government. The government was condemned by the Communist International, as well as the absent communist resistance to it. When the communists did try to revolt during the September Uprising, they were quickly crushed by the government and its IMRO allies. The new premier, Alexandar Tsankov, released the imprisoned IMRO chiefs Todor Alexandrov and Alexander Protogerov who were arrested by the old regime as part of their IMRO crackdown agreement with Yugoslavia. During the spring of 1924, at the sixth conference of the BCP, they unveiled their Macedonian resolution, which stated that an autonomous Macedonia can “assure right and liberty to all its nationalities”, and hails the “Macedonian Revolutionary Organization, the real leader of the Macedonian slaves". Macedonian autonomy was portrayed in light of a class struggle of its inhabitants against the oppression of the middle class of the occupier countries, not an ethnic struggle.

Signing and contents of the Manifesto

Continuing into 1924, the secret negotiations between the Federalists, BCP and IMRO representatives were conducted to unite all groups under the same goal: the independence or autonomy of a Macedonian state. In May 1924 party leaders Alexandrov, Protogerov and Petar Chaulev issued a new manifesto about the new orientation of the Macedonian Revolutionary Movement. This communist-influenced document reads as an excuse for a Macedonian state for the silliest of reasons: "endowed with the most varied natural riches and a favorable climate; with its ethnically diverse population of upwards of 2,302,000 persons; with a strategic and economic position in the middle of the Balkans [...] has all the rights and conditions necessary for an independent political existence. Forming an independent and self governing state". Once again the IMRO explicitly states Macedonia is multi-ethnic. It also declares its goal to be the "liberation and reunion of the separated parts of Macedonia in a fully autonomous and independent political unit within its natural geographic and ethnic frontiers". The new position of the IMRO was identical to that of the Balkan Communist Federation and won for the BCP the endorsement of its policy by the Comintern at its fifth congress that summer. The Congress considered the slogans formulated by the sixth Balkan Communist Federation Conference: "United Independent Macedonia" and "United Independent Thrace" wholly correct and truly revolutionary.

Consequences

The revelation that the formerly pro-Bulgarian patriotic IMRO officially sanctioned such a separatist document caused uproar in its ranks as well as the Bulgarian government. It was first published in Dimitar Vlahov's communist-inspired rag Federation Balcanique. The IMRO officially rejected its support of the document and its leaders even denied endorsing it. This did not spare them from the wrath of the Bulgarian government and the communists. In August 1924, IMRO chief Todor Alexandrov was assassinated. IMRO came under the leadership of Ivan Mihailov, who became a powerful figure in Bulgarian politics. While IMRO's leadership was quick to ascribe Alexandrov's murder to the communists and even quicker to organise a revenge action against the immediate perpetrators, there is some doubt that Mihailov himself might have been responsible for the murder. The result of the murder was further strife within the organisation and several high-profile murders, including those of Petar Chaulev in Milan and ultimately Protogetov himself. The IMRO led by Mihailov took actions against the former left-wing assassinating Todor Panitsa in Vienna in 1924. Dimo Hadjidimov, Georgi Skrizhovski, Alexander Bujnov, Chudomir Kantardjiev and many others were killed in the events on 1925. As for Dimitar Vlahov, together with the survivors of Ivan Mihailov's purge, formed the IMRO (United) in 1925; a socialist offshoot which took the official communist line. Although it supported Macedonian independence it drew little popular support.

See also
Macedonian Bulgarians
Macedonian Question
Macedonian nationalism
United Macedonia

References

Further reading
Националноосвободителната борба в Македония, 1919 - 1941 г. Част 4 от "Освободителните борби на Македония", Македонски Научен Институт, София, 2002 г. Глава 2 Разногласия в освободителното движение. Майският манифест. Убийството на Тодор Александров.
Обречено родолюбие. ВМРО в Пиринско 1919-1934, Димитър Тюлеков. I. Създаване и дейност на ВМРО в Пиринска Македония (1919-1924). 3. Кризата във ВМРО и наложеното стабилизиране на пиринската спомагателна база.

External links
The text of the May Manifesto (Macedonian)

Modern history of Macedonia (region)
Internal Macedonian Revolutionary Organization
Political manifestos
1924 in politics
1924 documents